XHMTLA-FM is a public radio station on 98.3 FM, owned by the municipality of Tlatlaya, State of Mexico. The station broadcasts from studios and a transmitter located at the municipal government building.

History
XHMTLA-FM's concession was awarded in 2018. The station officially came on the air December 1 after testing for nearly two months.

References

External links

Radio stations in the State of Mexico
Radio stations established in 2018
2018 establishments in Mexico